The Fort Saskatchewan Community Hospital is an acute care hospital located in Fort Saskatchewan, Alberta. The facility opened in 2012, replacing the former Fort Saskatchewan Health Centre.

Services and programs
The main services and programs the hospital provides are:
38 acute care beds
Community Rehabilitation Neurological Physical Therapy Services
Dedicated outpatient department
Emergency Departments
General Radiology
Hospital Information, Switchboards and Patient Location
Immunization - Adult and School Services
Laboratory, pharmacy and rehabilitation services
Obstetrical program
Pulmonary Rehabilitation Program
Radiology services
Surgical program including cataract surgeries
A Health Services Centre is linked to the hospital, and is home to:

 Community health

 Public health

 Home care

 Mental health services

 Rehabilitation services

 Partner organizations: Child and Family Services

References

Hospital buildings completed in 2012
Hospitals in Alberta
Edmonton Metropolitan Region
Fort Saskatchewan
Heliports in Canada
Certified airports in Alberta
2012 establishments in Alberta